Kaia Urb (also Kaia Galina Urb; born on 26 February 1956 in Tallinn) is an Estonian singer (soprano). She is especially known by her oratorio performances.

She has graduated from Tallinn State Conservatory in music pedagogics and singing speciality.

Since 1982 she has been a member of Estonian Philharmonic Chamber Choir. She has sung many solo parts at the choir. Her repertoire is wide: from baroque music to contemporary classical music. She has also sung with the ensembles Camerata Tallinn and Corelli Consort.

Awards:. 
 1996 and 1998: Annual Prize of the Estonian Cultural Endowment for Music
 2013: Order of the White Star, IV class.

References

Living people
1956 births
Estonian operatic sopranos
20th-century Estonian women singers
21st-century Estonian women singers
Recipients of the Order of the White Star, 4th Class
Estonian Academy of Music and Theatre alumni
Singers from Tallinn